Bout de Zan et l'embusqué (Bout de Zan and the Shirker) is a 1915 short silent film by Louis Feuillade. Louis Feuillade directed between 1912 and 1916 about sixty short films with Bout de Zan, a little boy played by René Poyen, as a recurring hero.

Plot 
France during World War I: Bout de Zan is irritated by his uncle's friend Marius always bragging about his shooting skills. When Marius bets that he will shoot a small bird in a tree, Bout de Zan finds out that he has paid a boy to drop a dead bird from the tree against which he will shoot a blank. Bout de Zan has the dead bird replaced by a stuffed one accompanied by a note saying that rather than lying he should go and fight the Germans. Ashamed, Marius rushes to enlist.

Production
The film was produced by Sté. des Etablissements L. Gaumont, the company created in 1895 by Léon Gaumont.

References

External links
 
Bout de Zan et l'embusqué (1915) at A Cinema History

1915 films
Films directed by Louis Feuillade
French silent short films
French black-and-white films
1910s French films